The 2018 Shenzhen Open (known as 2018 Shenzhen Gemdale Open for sponsorship reason) was a tennis tournament played on outdoor hard courts. It was the sixth edition of the Shenzhen Open, and part of the WTA International tournaments of the 2018 WTA Tour. It took place at the Shenzhen Longgang Sports Center in Shenzhen, China, from 1 to 7 January 2018.

Points and prize money

Point distribution

Prize money

1 Qualifiers prize money is also the Round of 32 prize money
* per team

Singles main draw entrants

Seeds

1 Rankings as of December 25, 2017.

Other entrants
The following players received wildcards into the singles main draw:
  Liu Fangzhou
  Wang Xiyu
  Wang Yafan 
The following players received entry from the qualifying draw:
  Danka Kovinić
  Anna Blinkova
  Stefanie Vögele
  Jasmine Paolini

Withdrawals
Before the tournament
  Kateryna Kozlova → replaced by  Nicole Gibbs
  Sara Sorribes Tormo → replaced by  Jana Čepelová

Doubles main draw entrants

Seeds

1 Rankings as of December 25, 2017.

Other entrants 
The following pairs received wildcards into the doubles main draw:
  Guo Hanyu /  Wang Xinyu
  Kang Jiaqi /  Zhang Shuai

Champions

Singles

  Simona Halep def.  Kateřina Siniaková, 6–1, 2–6, 6–0

Doubles

  Irina-Camelia Begu /  Simona Halep def.  Barbora Krejčíková /  Kateřina Siniaková, 1–6, 6–1, [10–8]

References

External links
Official website 

2018 in Chinese tennis
2018 WTA Tour
January 2018 sports events in China
2018